Up Jumped Benny is a live album by saxophonist/composer Benny Golson that was recorded in 1996 and originally released by the Arkadia Jazz label.

Reception

The AllMusic review by Richard S. Ginell said "Benny Golson had not appeared on an American jazz label in a long time, so Bob Karcy of Arkadia Jazz stepped in where others feared to tread, issuing this live gig from a jazz club somewhere in Switzerland on the last day of a tour ... Stanley Crouch's liner notes are full of his usual respect-your-elders blather and the sound quality is boxy, but Golson's fans will feel fortunate to have this".

JazzTimes' Harvey Pekar observed "In addition to being among the great jazz composer-arrangers, Golson’s a superb tenor saxophonist ... The group takes a couple of tunes at a rapid clip but most are done at medium and slow tempos. On them Golson’s warm tone and inventiveness come to the fore. And he can still cook".

Track listing 
All compositions by Benny Golson except where noted
 "Up Jumped Spring" (Freddie Hubbard) – 8:48
 "Stablemates" – 8:46
 Talk Intro – 0:23
 "Tiny Capers" (Clifford Brown) – 10:45
 Talk Intro – 0:24
 "I Remember Clifford" – 15:21
 "For Old Times Sake" (James Williams) – 6:32
 "Whisper Not" – 10:02
 "Gypsy Jingle Jangle" – 10:25

Personnel 
Benny Golson – tenor saxophone
Kevin Hays – piano
Dwayne Burno - bass 
Carl Allen – drums

Production
Michael Muller – producer
Heiri Wolf – engineer

References 

Benny Golson live albums
1997 live albums
Arkadia Jazz live albums